Notre Dame de Namur University (NDNU) is a private Catholic university in Belmont, California. It is the third oldest college in California and the first college in the state authorized to grant the baccalaureate degree to women. In 2021, the university announced it will begin to operate as a graduate school only.

The university is organized into three schools: the School of Business and Management, the School of Education, and the School of Psychology. Notre Dame de Namur University offers 15 undergraduate degrees, 10 graduate degrees and four credentials. In addition to traditional undergraduate and graduate programs, the university offers an evening bachelor's degree completion program for working adults as well as online degree programs.

History

Notre Dame de Namur University was founded by the Sisters of Notre Dame de Namur as the Academy of Notre Dame in 1851 on 10 acres in San Jose, California. The school was chartered in 1868 as the College of Notre Dame, the first college in the state of California authorized to grant the baccalaureate degree to women. In 1922, the Sisters purchased Ralston Hall, the country estate of William Chapman Ralston, founder of the Bank of California. The college opened its doors in Belmont in 1923.

In 1953 the College of Notre Dame became a four-year college with 23 Sisters of Notre Dame de Namur involved in the school. The college introduced evening classes in 1955, and in 1965, started the teaching credential programs. Originally a women's institution, College of Notre Dame became coeducational in 1969; three men graduated as part of the class of 1970. The college expanded its offerings to include master's degrees in 1972 and added evening undergraduate programs in 1987.

In 2001, the college established a structure dividing the university into schools. The name of the institution was changed to Notre Dame de Namur University that same year. In 2009, the university began offering partnerships with local community colleges to provide greater access to higher education, and that same year it became a Hispanic-Serving Institution, meaning at least 25% of its undergraduate population is Hispanic, that same year. The online degree program was established in 2012, and in 2013, the university introduced one of the first PhD programs in art therapy in the nation. The university established a new campus in Tracy, California in 2015, offering evening undergraduate and graduate degree programs in business administration.

Launched in 2013, Notre Dame de Namur University was one of the first universities in the United States to offer a Ph.D. in Art Therapy. The Art Therapy Ph.D. is also the first doctoral program offered at the university.

In 2016 the faculty, both full-time and adjunct, unionized with SEIU 1021. This was a historic move since tenure-line professors at Catholic universities have had trouble unionizing since the Yeshiva ruling (1980).

In December 2017, BINA48 (a Hanson Robotics robot) successfully participated as a guest student in a full semester college course on philosophy and love created and taught by Professor William J. Barry at Notre Dame de Namur University. The robot used an algorithm framework called TQ Theory created by Professor Barry to interact with rapport with students.

In March 2020, the university announced major changes as a result of on-going financial issues, declining enrollment, and effects of the COVID-19 pandemic. The Board of Trustees made the decision to prioritize current students completing degrees by the end of the 2020–21 academic year while assisting other students in transfer options due to uncertainty of operations beyond the spring 2021 semester. As part of the plan, Notre Dame suspended new student admissions for summer and fall 2020 sessions. The university also disbanded the athletics department at the conclusion of the 2019–20 academic year.

In 2022, Notre Dame de Namur University became the first West Coast university to provide temporary housing for Afghan Refugees.

Campus

Notre Dame de Namur University is located in Belmont, California on the San Francisco Bay Area Peninsula and near the Pacific Ocean. The campus is less than 30 miles from downtown San Francisco and downtown San Jose.

Residence halls

Notre Dame de Namur University offers traditional dorm living in Julie Billiart Hall and St. Joseph's Hall, which are named for the co-foundresses of the Sisters of Notre Dame, Sister Julie Billiart and Sister St. Joseph Blin de Bourdon. The Carroll, Kane, and Wilkie Apartments are available for upperclassmen. Students also have the option of suite living in New Hall, where suites feature four rooms joined by a common area and sharing a bathroom. Residence hall floors are co-ed. Saint Joseph's hall has now been transformed into faculty offices and also contains a lounge and the Housing Office.

Academic buildings

Cuvilly Hall, named for Sr. Julie Billiart's birthplace, is one of the main instructional buildings and houses the School of Business and Management. St. Mary's Hall is the largest instructional building and includes classrooms; science labs; two computer labs; public safety; and the financial aid, registrar, and business offices. Gavin Hall is the smallest of the three main instructional buildings and houses the Art Therapy program.

The theater of Notre Dame de Namur University is located below the main campus on Ralston Avenue.

Ralston Hall

The Notre Dame de Namur University campus developed around Ralston Hall Mansion. William Chapman Ralston built Ralston Hall shortly after purchasing the property in 1864. William Ralston was a pivotal figure in the gold and silver bonanzas, which helped Ralston amass wealth. Ralston Hall was built with a steamboat gothic design on the interior, which is rumored to have been influenced by Ralston's love of boating from a young age. The interior of Ralston Hall is strikingly shaped like the inside of a boat. Ralston Hall was built as an entertainment destination. After William Ralston died, his business partner, William Sharon, came to control the mansion. Sharon was a United States senator representing Nevada from 1875 to 1881. Ralston Hall has been used for a variety of jobs throughout its history; Ralston Hall held one of the largest American weddings when William Sharon's daughter Flora married Sir Thomas Fermor-Hesketh of England. Notre Dame De Namur was chartered by the State of California in 1868 but was not affiliated with Ralston Hall until 1922. The mansion was a finishing school for young women until 1898. Since 1923 Ralston Hall has been affiliated with Notre Dame de Namur University.

Until April 2012, the mansion housed admissions, administrative and faculty offices, and its first floor rooms, including a ballroom modeled after the Hall of Mirrors at Versailles, were rented for events. However, in late 2011, a preliminary assessment of the structural integrity of Ralston Hall suggested that occupants may not be safe in the event of an earthquake. The building is unoccupied indefinitely, until funds can be raised to complete a replacement or retrofit of the masonry foundation, in addition to extensive seismic work on the upper floors. The renovation is estimated to cost more than $20 million

Satellite programs
Notre Dame de Namur University offers some bachelor's degree programs in partnership with local community college campuses. Adult students who have completed enough units to enter Notre Dame de Namur University's evening bachelor's program can take the remaining classes for their bachelor's degree on the community college campus and receive a degree from NDNU. The university established a partnership with Mission College in Santa Clara, California in 2008 and offers a human services and a business degree on the community college campus. A human services program was established with Cañada College in Redwood City, California in 2009. In 2010, evening business  and psychology degrees were added to the partnership with Cañada College.

In 2015, the university launched a satellite campus in Tracy, California. The NDNU Tracy campus offers undergraduate and graduate degree programs in business administration, a bachelor's in human services, as well as teaching credentials. The classes are held in the evening in an accelerated format.

Organization and administration
Notre Dame de Namur University is a nonprofit organization governed by a Board of Trustees.

University administration consists of a president, a provost, vice presidents for enrollment management, advancement, and finance and administration, a dean of students, and deans of the three schools.

The university is organized into three schools: the College of Arts and Sciences, the School of Business and Management, and the School of Education and Psychology. Each school is led by a dean.

Student Assembly

The Student Assembly is the official student governing body of the university. The purpose of the Student Assembly Leadership Team (SALT) is to represent and to provide for the general welfare of the student body and the university. The leadership consists of a president, vice presidents for communications and finance, and two senators from each school.

Academics

Notre Dame de Namur University is a liberal arts institution offering bachelor's and master's degrees, a doctoral degree in Art Therapy, and teaching credentials. In addition to the degrees offered on the campus, several programs are available 100% online: bachelor's in Criminal Justice, Master of Arts in Teaching English to Speakers of Other Languages (TESOL), a Master of Science in Business Administration, and Master of Public Administration.

Notre Dame de Namur University is currently ranked by U.S. News & World Report among the Best Regional Universities West and Best Value Schools.

Community-based learning
As part of the university's mission of social justice and the goal of equipping students with "what they need to know for life," Notre Dame de Namur University offers over 20 community-based learning (CBL) courses, designed to promote learning through community engagement. These courses involve partnerships within the community, and work for an outcome of affecting positive social change. Many of the academic programs at Notre Dame de Namur University offer CBL courses, including psychology, religious studies, sociology, accounting, biological sciences, communications, natural science, and music. NDNU has received the Carnegie Foundation's Elective Community Engagement Classification.

Accreditation
Notre Dame de Namur University is accredited by the Western Association of Schools and Colleges (WASC), Senior College and University Commission. Accredited or approved programs at Notre Dame de Namur University include:
Education Credentials: California Commission on Teacher Credentialing
Art Therapy: American Art Therapy Association
Marriage and Family Therapy: meets established guidelines of the California Board of Behavioral Sciences
Clinical Psychology/MFT: meets established guidelines of the California Board of Behavioral Sciences
Business: Accreditation Council for Business Schools and Programs

Sister Dorothy Stang Center 
The Sister Dorothy Stang Center for Social Justice and Community Engagement (DSC) was established on the Notre Dame de Namur University campus in honor of the work of Sister Dorothy Stang, SNDdeN, who was murdered in Brazil due to her efforts to aid the poor farmers and the environment in that country. The center works to increase awareness of social and environmental justice issues, as well as encourage dialogue, community service, engagement, and activism in these areas. Members of the university and the larger community can work with the DSC to create positive social change, and come to a greater understanding of the issues that affect the community.

Athletics 
The Notre Dame de Namur University Argonauts were the athletic teams of the university until 2020. The university mascot, the Argonaut, was named for the mythical Argonauts who sailed with Jason in search of the Golden Fleece. The team colors blue, gold and white reflected the colors of the university.

At the time of the discontinuation, NDNU had 12 varsity sports. Men's sports included basketball, cross country, golf, lacrosse, soccer, and track & field; while women's sports included basketball, cross country, soccer, softball, tennis, track & field, and volleyball.

Notre Dame athletics competed in the Division II level of the National Collegiate Athletic Association (NCAA), primarily competing in the Northern California Athletic Conference (NCAC) until after the 1996–97 season when the conference disbanded. NDNU joined the National Association of Intercollegiate Athletics (NAIA) and the California Pacific Conference (Cal Pac) from 1996–97 to 2004–05. The university re-joined the NCAA and the D-II ranks in 2005 when the Pacific West Conference (PacWest) voted to admit Notre Dame de Namur University.

The university most recently competed at the Division II level as members of the Pacific West, except for men's lacrosse, which had an Independent affiliation after leaving the Western Intercollegiate Lacrosse Association at the end of the 2014 spring season (2013–14 school year). In March 2020, the university announced the discontinuation of the athletics programs effective at the conclusion of the Spring 2020 semester. The decision was part of various changes to the university, citing an on-going financial situation and declining enrollment.

Diversity 

Notre Dame de Namur University is one of the most diverse private colleges in California, qualifying as both a Hispanic Serving Institution (HSI) and an Asian American Native American Pacific Islander Serving Institution (AANAPISI). The university's commitment to diversity is based on the Hallmarks of a Notre Dame de Namur Learning Community, which states, "We embrace the gift of diversity."

Notable alumni
Maria Cristina Villanova de Arbenz, politician and First Lady of Guatemala
Lailee Bakhtiar, poet, journalist, author, novelist
Eddie Baza Calvo, politician, governor of Guam
Belo Cipriani, writer and LGBT activist
Simon Enciso, professional athlete in basketball
Abigail Campbell Kawānanakoa, politician and Princess of Hawaii
Morghan King, Olympic athlete in weightlifting
Matthew Mbu Junior, politician, senator of Federal Republic of Nigeria
Barbara Morgan, NASA astronaut
Susan Heon Preston, Olympic athlete in swimming
Anton del Rosario, professional athlete in soccer
Dorothy Stang, class of 1964; activist, Sister of Notre Dame de Namur
Susie Wind, visual artist
Emily Wu, author and novelist
Wang Yi, Olympic athlete in volleyball

References

External links

 
 Official athletics website 

 
Universities and colleges in San Mateo County, California
Educational institutions established in 1851
Sisters of Notre Dame de Namur colleges and universities
California Historical Landmarks
School buildings on the National Register of Historic Places in California
National Register of Historic Places in the San Francisco Bay Area
Schools accredited by the Western Association of Schools and Colleges
Catholic universities and colleges in California
Association of Catholic Colleges and Universities
Former women's universities and colleges in the United States
1851 establishments in California